

Active clubs
During the season 2018–19, overall 44 Montenegrin football clubs play in Montenegrin First League, Montenegrin Second League and Montenegrin Third League.
First and Second League have 10 members, while in three groups of Third League are playing 29 teams.

Clubs by region
Below the Football Association of Montenegro (FSCG), there are three territorial sub-associations, founded by FSCG—its Football Associations of Central, South, and North regions. Every single club is a member of FSCG and their territorial sub-association.

Central region

South region

North region

Former clubs
During the past, many clubs that existed for some time were dissolved, temporarily closed, merged with another club or today have only teams that participate in youth leagues.

See also
 Montenegrin First League
 Montenegrin Second League
 Montenegrin Third League
 Montenegrin Cup
 Montenegrin Regional Cups

Montenegro
 
clubs
Football clubs